Red Clay Creek Presbyterian Church, also known as McKennan's Church, is a historic Presbyterian church located at Mill Creek and McKennan's Church Roads near Newark, New Castle County, Delaware.  It was built in 1853, and is a two-story, stuccoed stone structure.  It was originally rectangular in plan, but additions have given it an irregular cruciform shape.  It features a colonnaded porch in the Greek Revival style with a fanlight and an enclosed vestibule.  The south wall incorporates a date stone from the original church building, marked "WM 1761".

It was added to the National Register of Historic Places in 1973.

References

Presbyterian churches in Delaware
Churches on the National Register of Historic Places in Delaware
Greek Revival church buildings in Delaware
Churches completed in 1853
19th-century Presbyterian church buildings in the United States
Churches in New Castle County, Delaware
National Register of Historic Places in New Castle County, Delaware